Richard of Capua may refer to:

Richard I of Capua (died 1078), count of Aversa and prince of Capua
Richard II of Capua (died 1105/1106), called the Bald, count of Aversa and the prince of Capua
Richard III of Capua  (died 1120), count of Aversa and prince of Capua